American Society of Health-System Pharmacists (ASHP) is a professional organization that represents pharmacists who serve as patient care providers in hospitals, health systems, ambulatory clinics, and other healthcare settings. The organization's nearly 58,000 members include pharmacists, student pharmacists, and pharmacy technicians. ASHP maintains a national database on U.S. drug shortages that is published on their website.

Purpose
The aim of the society is to support the professional practice of pharmacists in hospitals and health systems. In addition, the society advocates to government agencies, such as the Food and Drug Administration (FDA) and the Centers for Disease Control and Prevention (CDC) on public policy issues related to medication use and public health.

Publications
American Journal of Health-System Pharmacy
AHFS Drug Information Book
Handbook on Injectable Drugs
Best Practices for Hospital and Health-System Pharmacy
ASHP Intersections
Clinical Pharmacy (published 1982–1993)

References

External links
American Society of Health-System Pharmacists
ASHP Foundation

Pharmacy organizations in the United States
Pharmacy-related professional associations
Organizations established in 1942
1942 establishments in the United States